Gwaun-Cae-Gurwen is a village and community in the borough of Neath Port Talbot, South West Wales. Historically a part of Glamorgan, Gwaun-Cae-Gurwen is a parish made up of the electoral wards of Gwaun-Cae-Gurwen and Lower Brynamman.

Location
Gwaun-Cae-Gurwen is located five mile east of the nearest town of Ammanford and nearly 
fifteen miles north of Swansea. Nearby villages include Cwmgors, Lower Brynaman & Tairgwaith.

Etymology
The name Gwaun-Cae-Gurwen is believed to be an alteration of what was originally gwaun cegerwen (i.e. "white hemlock heath" in Welsh, ceger being a dialect form of cegid). In local usage, the name is often shortened to "Y Waun", meaning "the heath" in Welsh.

History
Gwaun-cae-Gurwen was a mining village in the west Wales anthracite district. There were six or seven pits in the early 1920s.

Schools
Ysgol Gynradd Gymraeg Gwauncaegurwen (Gwaun-cae-Gurwen Welsh Primary School) used to be on Heol y Dŵr (Water Street) which is where the Pwll y Wrach estate is based. It has since been moved to Heol Newydd (New Road), overlooking the village, and the former school transformed into a wood workshop.

Secondary-age children in the area have the choice of going to Ysgol Gyfun Ystalyfera in Ystalyfera (for full Welsh-medium education), Ysgol Dyffryn Aman (for Welsh- and English-medium education), or Cwmtawe Community School (for English-medium education).

Welsh language
The Welsh Language Board reported in 2009 that 67.9% of the population of Gwaun-Cae-Gurwencan speak, read or write in Welsh. 10–19 year olds were the group with the highest percentage of Welsh speakers.

Representation
The area is represented in the House of Commons by Christina Rees, and in the Senedd by Jeremy Miles; they both represent the Neath constituency.

The electoral ward mentioned above has a population taken at the 2011 census of 2,910.

Sport
Cwmgors RFC play their home games at Parc-y-werin, Gwaun-Cae-Gurwen. Their clubhouse is also situated at New Road, Gwaun-Cae-Gurwen.

Notable natives
 Sir Gareth Edwards, former Wales and British and Irish Lions player; a street, Maes Gareth Edwards, is named after him
 Dame Siân Phillips, actress
 Barry Morgan, Archbishop of Wales and Bishop of Llandaff
 Gwenda Thomas, former member of the Senedd and Deputy Minister in the Welsh Government

Pwll-y-Wrach
At one time, almost all of the land of The Waun was owned by the Jones Family who also owned the "Pwll-y-Wrach Estate". It was run by the Head and later by their sons (and spouses). They still own parts of the land of the village but most has been sold off. Both farmhouses connected to the Estate are still standing. They are: Pwll-y-Wrach and Glangwrach. Pwll y Wrach is the main house where the head of the family lived.

It is no longer a farming estate but remains to own much of the land in the village. The name means the Witch's Pool in English, because of an old Welsh myth that the witches lived in it because of the greeny-blue colour and would sometimes come out to haunt the locals.

References

External links
 www.geograph.co.uk : photos of Gwaun-Cae-Gurwen and surrounding area
 Gwaun Cae Gurwen Community Council website

Villages in Neath Port Talbot
Communities in Neath Port Talbot
Amman Valley